Terminator: The Sarah Connor Chronicles (sometimes abbreviated as Terminator: TSCC or simply TSCC) is an American science fiction television series that aired on Fox from January 13, 2008 to April 10, 2009. The show was produced by Warner Bros. Television, and C2 Pictures (C2 Pictures was replaced by The Halcyon Company in season two). It is a spin-off from the Terminator series of films. It revolves around the lives of the fictional characters Sarah and John Connor, disregarding the events of Terminator 3: Rise of the Machines and picking up shortly after Terminator 2: Judgment Day left off. The series premiered on Sunday, January 13, 2008, on the U.S. television network Fox. Production for the series was provided by the Judgment Day and Rise of the Machines producers and C2 Pictures, Sony Pictures Entertainment (International) co-presidents Mario Kassar and Andrew G. Vajna, C2 Senior Vice President James Middleton, David Nutter and Josh Friedman, who not only served as executive producer but also wrote the script for the first two episodes.

The show opened mid-season with a shortened run of nine episodes, January through March 2008. It was the highest-rated new scripted series of the 2007–08 television season
and was renewed for a second season,
which began on September 8, 2008, and ended April 10, 2009 (the same year Warner Bros. and the Halcyon Company produced McG's Terminator Salvation). On May 18, 2009, despite fan efforts,
Fox Entertainment president Kevin Reilly announced Fox would not renew the show for a third season.

Plot

Back story

In the year 1995 (1997 in the show), at the end of Terminator 2: Judgment Day, Sarah Connor, her son John and the 800-series Terminator successfully destroy the T-1000, as well as the arm and CPU chip from the Terminator sent back to 1984 in the first film. The T-800 from the second film, at its own request, is then also destroyed to eliminate any future technology that could be used to create Skynet through reverse engineering. Despite this, at the beginning of the television series, a T-888 using the name "Cromartie" is sent back to 1999 to kill John. "Cameron", a Terminator that John sent back from 2029 to protect his younger self, leaps forward in time with John and Sarah to 2007 to prevent a delayed Judgment Day once and for all. Now wanted fugitives with the fear of pending leukemia preying on Sarah's mind, they must also face the reality that other enemies from the future could be after them.

Summary
Four years after the events of the second film, Sarah, her son John, and Cameron (a Terminator that has been re-programmed to protect John), are being pursued by a Terminator, Cromartie, sent back through time to assassinate John and also by FBI Special Agent James Ellison, who initially believes Sarah is an insane criminal (based on the events of Terminator 2: Judgment Day).
Sarah is romantically involved with a paramedic named Charley Dixon, but ends her relationship with him to stay on the run.

During the pilot, Sarah, John, and Cameron make a temporal leap to 2007. Cromartie suffers extensive damage while trying to kill them, but begins repairing his endoskeleton and artificial flesh and continues his search for John in 2007. When John is frustrated with their life of running, Sarah resolves to go on the offensive against Skynet. Yet the world in 2007 proves complex: they find Skynet has sent additional Terminators back in time to support its own creation, and the resistance movement has sent back its own fighters to interfere. As they seek out an intuitive chess computer called "the Turk" (named after the 18th-century hoax using that name), which they suspect may be a precursor to Skynet, they forge an alliance with Derek Reese, a resistance fighter who has time traveled from the post-nuclear future, and is John's uncle. As the series progresses, the Connors are confronted with the reality that they will find more enemies, either at the present or from the future, bent on reshaping the future for their own goals.

Episodes

Cast and characters

Main 
 Lena Headey as Sarah Connor:  Sarah Connor is a major character in the Terminator series. She is the mother of John Connor, who will one day become the leader of the human resistance. The authorities, however, see her as a deranged fugitive. Series creator Josh Friedman saw over 300 actresses for the role and described the actress he was looking for was someone "who embodied that spirit and who was believable in that role and not just some glammed up, Hollywood, actressy thing".  After a friend recommended English actress Lena Headey for the role, Friedman watched her audition tape, and thought she was "a tough, tough woman". Having seen The Terminator when she was a teenager, which "scared the hell out of" her, Headey was aware of the iconic status of the character and in regards to Linda Hamilton's portrayal of the role in the film series, she remarked, "Linda Hamilton will always be the original Sarah Connor and it's a very strong print that she's left, but hopefully people will embrace what I bring to Sarah and see it with fresh eyes". When asked about her approach to the role, Headey said I'm playing a mother who is a single parent, bringing up a teenage son, who also happens to save the world—as a byline to her life. And the way I would play that is someone who's passionate and scared and angry and a mother, all these things. So I approach that just trying to be honest within the boundaries of her. However, the choice to cast Headey was criticized by several fans and critics who argued that she bore no resemblance to the athletic, muscular woman established by Hamilton, who transformed her body into that of a muscled warrior for Terminator 2: Judgment Day. The controversy was covered by the Los Angeles Times, the Boston Herald, and The Guardian, as well as in online forums.
 Thomas Dekker as John Connor:  John Connor is Sarah's son and the future leader of the human resistance. He is only 15 years old at the beginning of the show, turning sixteen in the season one finale. As the series progresses, John struggles with his feelings for Cameron, who is a Terminator. Dekker was cast after Headey secured the role of Sarah Connor. Regarding the Terminator films, Dekker says They are like my favorite films when I was younger. So it's very ironic that I'm getting to do this. And I know for the younger generation and for myself, John was equally important to me as Sarah was, and I know a lot of the people that I hear from really, really care about John. Dekker describes his character as "a continuation of Eddie Furlong's character" but "he's in a darker, more mature place now". John De Vito played as the young John Connor in two episodes "Queen's Gambit" and "To the Lighthouse".
 Summer Glau as Cameron / Allison Young: T-900 TOK715  Cameron is a Terminator whom John Connor sent back from 2027 to protect his earlier self. Her model and exact capabilities are not known, but she can mimic human mannerisms better than the T-800 model could, and she can also consume small amounts of food, a first for Terminators. Her name is an homage to Terminator film franchise creator James Cameron. Glau had not seen the Terminator films prior to being cast as Cameron Phillips, whose role in the series was initially kept concealed but was later revealed to be a Terminator sent from the future to protect John. Friedman had previously wanted to cast Glau in a pilot he wrote four years prior to The Sarah Connor Chronicles, but she was already committed to Serenity. Glau almost did not audition for the role because of her preconceptions of the character and she felt that she did not have "that Terminator look". On playing Cameron, Glau said she was "intimidated" by the role because it was a challenge for her to balance the human and robot characteristics. Later in the series it is revealed that Cameron assumed the identity of a resistance fighter, Allison Young, before being reprogrammed.
 Richard T. Jones as James Ellison:  James Ellison is an FBI Special Agent pursuing Sarah Connor. At first puzzled by what he initially thinks is Sarah's outlandish story, he later collects irrefutable evidence of the existence of Terminators (including the body of Cromartie) and gradually realizes the truth. Jones describes his character as a "man of faith" and likens him to that of Tommy Lee Jones in The Fugitive. Jones was allowed to improvize a few lines to provide "a little bit of comic relief" to the show. In the second season, Ellison pursues employment with ZeiraCorp, allying himself with Catherine Weaver (whom he does not know is a Terminator until the series finale).
 Brian Austin Green as Derek Reese:  Derek Reese is a Resistance fighter sent to the past by the future John Connor. He is the older brother of Kyle Reese (John Connor's father) and paternal uncle of John. He knows Cameron in the future, but still does not trust her. He is recurring in the first season but becomes a regular in the second season. Derek knows Jesse Flores who arrives from the future. He is killed by a Terminator while attempting to save Savannah Weaver. Another Derek from an alternate timeline is introduced in the series finale.
 Leven Rambin as Riley Dawson:  Riley Dawson is John's new love interest that he meets at school, much to the consternation of Sarah. John does not reveal the story of his life to her, but as they get closer, he realizes he is endangering her life. Unknown to John, a resistance fighter, Jesse, has brought Riley back from the future to prevent John from getting too close to Cameron, and to get close to John. She appears to develop genuine romantic feelings for John. Jesse later kills Riley after a struggle.
 Garret Dillahunt as Cromartie / John Henry:  Cromartie is a T-888 sent back in time to kill John Connor in the pilot episode, in which he was portrayed by Owain Yeoman. He takes damage to his biological covering, revealing his metal endoskeleton. After he finds a new biological covering in the episode "The Turk" in the shape of actor George Laszlo, he continues his search for John. After chasing John and Riley into Mexico, Cromartie's chip is destroyed and John buries his body in the desert. When John returns later to destroy Cromartie's body, it has been moved. Ellison has recovered the body for Catherine Weaver, who connects Cromartie's body to the Babylon A.I. named John Henry. Dillahunt was a recurring character in the first season, but becomes a regular character in the last season, portraying Laszlo, Cromartie and John Henry.
 Shirley Manson as Catherine Weaver (season 2): Catherine Weaver is a shape-shifting Terminator disguised as the CEO of a high-tech corporation called ZeiraCorp. A model T-1001, her liquid metal form as she changes shape resembles a faster, more easily  recovering version of the T-1000 seen in Terminator 2: Judgment Day. She keeps a portion of herself separate in the fish tank of her office, in the appearance of an eel. When attacked in the final episode this part rejoins her main body. She is focused on developing artificial intelligence using The Turk, the intuitive computer at first believed to be a precursor to Skynet (but later shown to be a separate entity). She targets other Terminators to reverse-engineer Skynet technology in the present, and to prepare for the future war. She plans on using this research to fight Skynet. Despite the revelation that Weaver is an enemy of Skynet, it is still unknown where her allegiance lies. Weaver hints at her motives in the episode "Born to Run" when she asks Cameron, "Will you join us?" through messenger James Ellison. During the episode "Today Is the Day Part 2" Cameron explains to Jesse Flores that John Connor asked the same question of the T-1001 in an attempt to forge an alliance against Skynet.

Supporting 
 Dean Winters as Charley Dixon:  Charley Dixon, a paramedic, is Sarah's fiancé until she leaves him in the pilot episode and travels eight years forward in time. Although he marries another woman in the interim, during subsequent episodes he builds a friendship with the Connors and renders medical assistance when needed. When his wife is killed in the second season episode "The Mousetrap", he is not seen again until the episode "To The Lighthouse", which reveals that he now lives in a lighthouse, being a safe house that Sarah set up for him, which he has booby trapped and alarmed to protect against further attacks. When the house is invaded by human assassins acting for the apparent proto-Skynet, Charley is killed enabling John Connor to escape.
 Stephanie Jacobsen as Jesse Flores:  Jesse is an Australian resistance sailor and Derek Reese's love interest. In her timeline, she sailed to Australia to deliver supplies aboard the upgraded nuclear submarine , captained by a reprogrammed Terminator, Queeg, of which she is the executive officer. Queeg diverts the submarine to pick up a package and return it to John Connor. Her crew is curious of what is in the package so they open it. Inside is a T-1001 and one of the crew members, a woman, points her gun at it. The T-1001 kills her and takes her form, then shakes its finger at the rest of the crew. Queeg kills a crewman after he beat on Jesse. Jesse does not trust Queeg and so she relieves him of command. Queeg does not obey her orders and so she terminates him and destroys the submarine in an attempt to kill the T-1001. On her way out, she encounters the T-1001 and it tells her, "Tell John Connor 'the answer is no'." In 2007, she is on a self-imposed mission to find and stop Cameron from adversely influencing young John, by recruiting Riley Dawson in the future and bringing her back to frame Cameron for her murder. In the future from which Jesse comes, John has withdrawn from humans and speaks only with Cameron. It is unclear whether this mission is self-appointed, but comments by her and the fact she was able to access the time travel machinery with Riley suggests others in the Resistance leadership group may share her concerns about Cameron's influence on John. John Connor later figures out that Jesse killed Riley and informs Derek, but orders her life to be spared. Derek confronts Jesse. He tells her that they are from two different futures and that he doesn't know who she is. He tells her, "John Connor wanted to let you go. I'm not John Connor." He pulls his gun on her and she takes off running. Whether or not Derek actually kills her is left ambiguous, although he does pull the trigger on his handgun. When asked about it by John he just says, "John Connor let her go." This could either mean that he obeyed John Connor's order or since he is not John Connor, he didn't want to let her go and shot her instead. Later on in a flashback, Cameron is seen talking to Jesse. Cameron tells her that she is sorry for her loss. She says that the pressure from leaving the submarine killed her baby, she was pregnant with Derek's baby. Jesse tells Cameron, "Tell John Connor it said 'The answer is no'" Then, Jesse asks Cameron, "If the answer is no, what was the question?" Cameron answers with "Will you join us?" Cameron tells Derek about the miscarriage and he says he never had any kids.

Production

Conception 
On November 9, 2005, Variety reported that a television series based on the Terminator franchise was being produced by C2 Pictures, which produced Terminator 3: Rise of the Machines, in association with Warner Bros. Television. The Fox Broadcasting Company also joined the project by making a commitment to the pilot, with Josh Friedman set to write the pilot and to serve as an executive producer for the series. Among the executive producers were C2 Pictures' Andy Vajna, Mario Kassar and James Middleton.

The series, initially titled The Sarah Connor Chronicles, focuses on the character Sarah Connor who is on the run with her son after the events of Terminator 2: Judgment Day. Regarding the character, Middleton said, "She has the weight of the world on her shoulders and also has to raise a teenage son who may be the salvation of humanity." Friedman commented that the series would contain fewer action sequences due to the smaller budget of television in contrast to feature films.

Fox Broadcasting greenlit production on August 28, 2006, after Warner Bros. Television hired David Nutter to direct the pilot. The series was among seven new TV shows picked up by Fox on May 13, 2007 for its 2007-08 television season. In regards to the plot of the series, Friedman said the show would avoid the "Terminator of the Week" plot device, and that Sarah, John, and Cameron will have other threats than just Terminators. Skynet would also come into play as the series progresses. Furthermore, Friedman stated that the events of Terminator 3: Rise of the Machines occur in an alternate timeline from that of the TV series. In addition to having planned the entire story arc for the first season, Friedman has a rough idea for the plot of the following three seasons. The series focused extensively on exploring religious and humanistic themes and ideas as had been started by the first movies in the Terminator franchise.

At the 2008 press tour, the show's cast and crew promised season two would be less serialized than the first. Producer Josh Friedman said his plans were to incorporate the unfilmed storylines from the remaining four episodes of season one into the start of season two.

Filming 
The pilot episode was filmed primarily in Albuquerque, New Mexico. The principal photography started on January 24, 2007 and took approximately one month to complete. Subsequent episodes in the series were filmed in the backlot of Warner Brothers Studios in Burbank, California, on a set previously used by Gilmore Girls to depict their fictional town, Stars Hollow.

Music 

Terminator: The Sarah Connor Chronicles features incidental music composed by Bear McCreary. For financial reasons, the main theme of the Terminator film series, originally composed by Brad Fiedel, is featured only briefly in the TV series—mainly during the title sequence. McCreary has stated that his score is inspired by the tone of Fiedel's score in the first two Terminator films and since Terminator: The Sarah Connor Chronicles is a direct sequel to Terminator 2: Judgment Day, he felt that the tone of the music should be consistent with that of the film as much as possible. He began working on the score by recording metallic sounds, using "oil cans, whale drums, chains, anvils, brake drums, garbage cans, thundersheets ... [etc.]", after which he edited the samples and created his own custom library of metallic drums. For every episode thereafter, live metal percussion elements were recorded on top of the electronics. While Fiedel's scores were performed using synthesizers, McCreary chose to use an ensemble of electric string instruments instead.

A musical theme was created for each of the principal characters. The theme for Sarah Connor is the most frequently used theme in addition to being the longest and the most developed theme in the series. There are two main sections to Sarah's theme with one presenting her "bad-ass, stoic warrior" side and the other as "a loving mother". John's theme was originally composed for a specific scene in the pilot episode and performed with a solo clarinet to convey his loneliness and awkwardness. McCreary stated that the "musical ambiguity in the melody" is used to show John's transformation in the series. Although themes were also written for other characters such as Derek Reese, James Ellison and the "evil terminator[s]", no themes were written for Cameron during the first season because McCreary felt that "her character was defined by her relationship with John, Sarah and the others around her" so Sarah's or John's theme was used in most of her scenes.

The series mainly features McCreary's original score. Songs and instrumental music from other sources are used sparingly. Alter Bridge's single "Rise Today" was used for the promotion of the first season and Robyn's "Crash and Burn Girl" in the second season. Three songs were used in the series: "The Man Comes Around" by Johnny Cash was used in the first-season finale and a cover of "Samson and Delilah" by Shirley Manson was used in the second-season premiere. Both songs were background music for action sequences in their respective episodes. The second-season episode "The Mousetrap" features "Safe Within Your Arms" by Greg Garing. "Nocturne in C-sharp minor" by Frédéric Chopin was used in the first-season episode "The Demon Hand". The episode "Mr. Ferguson Is Ill Today" features the song "La Llorona", originally written and recorded by Chavela Varga but Bear McCreary made his own version of it. The episode "Adam Raised a Cain" features a moody cover of "Donald, Where's Your Trousers" originally written and recorded by Andy Stewart, performed by Garret Dillahunt and Mackenzie Brooke Smith at the closing. The record label La-La Land Records released the original television soundtrack for Terminator: The Sarah Connor Chronicles on December 23, 2008.

Release

Marketing 
Prior to its broadcast on television, Fox undertook a large marketing effort to promote the show, which was described by Joe Earley, Fox Executive Vice President of Marketing and Communications, as the "biggest campaign for a new mid-season show in years." The advertising campaign began months prior to the premiere date to make sure that it would attract existing Terminator fans as well as welcome in new fans. After 24 was postponed to the 2008-09 TV season, more time was devoted to the show by Fox's marketing team and more on-air promotional spots were available for the show that would otherwise have gone to 24.

Fox began their advertising campaign for Terminator: The Sarah Connor Chronicles on September 27, 2007, with a brief teaser which ran during primetime programs, consisting of an image of two red dots that lasted for a few seconds on screen before disappearing. The two red dots were revealed to be the eyes of the Terminators from the show in the second phase of the advertising campaign, which began two weeks later. The final phase of the campaign commenced in November 2007 with more broadcast information being added to the advertisements.

In addition to on-air teasers, Fox heavily promoted the show during the World Series by releasing the first 45-second preview for the show on October 27, 2007. Other forms of advertisements used included: mobile tours on "Terminator" buses sponsored by Verizon Wireless; an interactive cell phone game based on the series offered by Verizon's V CAST, which rewarded the players with ring tones, wallpapers and behind-the-scenes footage; cable tie-ins; online outreach via the official website and wiki; online sneak peeks; and a poster design contest run by Fox. Advance screenings of the pilot episode were also held at the 2007 Comic-Con International convention and at Golden Apple Comics in Los Angeles on January 4, 2008.

In Super Bowl XLII, a Terminator was featured in a brief advertisement fighting Cleatus the Fox Sports Robot.

Billboard advertisements, which were described by Variety to have "blanketed New York and L.A.", contained images of Summer Glau's Terminator in a "Lady Godiva-esque pose" used to target the young-male demographic, while the key art emphasized on Sarah Connor being at the core of the show to attract the "mom demo". Fox originally planned for more outdoor marketing in other cities but the marketing budget was reduced because of the Writers' Strike.

A promotional partnership with automobile manufacturer Dodge began in the show's second season and featured placement of Dodge products in several episodes, Dodge's exclusive sponsorship of the extended, 52-minute episode "Goodbye to All That," and a four-week vehicle giveaway entitled "The Never Back Down Challenge."

Broadcast information 
An extended cut of the pilot was publicly screened for the first time on July 28, 2007, at the 2007 Comic-Con International convention. Originally scheduled to premiere on January 14, 2008, the television broadcast of the show was rescheduled to commence on January 13, 2008, after Fox reorganized their broadcast timetable due to the 2007–2008 Writers Guild of America (WGA) strike. As such, Fox's original intention to air Terminator: The Sarah Connor Chronicles in the Monday 8:00 p.m. ET timeslot as a lead-in program for 24 was also changed. The show was moved to the Monday 9:00 p.m. ET timeslot with Prison Break as its lead-in program.

Following the resolution of the WGA Strike, the Los Angeles Times printed a chart indicating the status of American network television series. The chart, reprinted by a number of other websites, categorized the series as "on the bubble" (in danger of cancellation). The Hollywood Reporter stated that the show would likely return. TV Guide then reported that "Fox has given producers the green light to start booking directors for next season's first three episodes". Fox later confirmed that the series would indeed receive a second season, which began on September 8, 2008, in the Monday 8:00 p.m. ET timeslot. Due to schedule changes from Fox, the show had a two-month break between December 16, 2008 – February 12, 2009. The show then aired on Fridays at 8:00 p.m. ET. The show was officially canceled on May 18, 2009.

On February 22, 2011, the Syfy channel announced it had gained the rights to all 31 episodes of the series, which began airing on April 7, 2011.

Home media
The first season was released on August 11, 2008 in the United Kingdom, on August 13, 2008 in Australia, and on August 19, 2008 in North America. The Region 1 DVD set contains all nine episodes aired from the first season, commentary on select episodes, audition tapes for select actors, video of Summer Glau practicing for her ballet scenes, making of features, and deleted scenes for certain episodes. The Region 2 and 4 versions have all nine episodes but has excluded all the special features apart from the deleted scenes. On the other hand, both the three-disc Blu-ray sets released in North America and Europe contain the same bonus features offered by the Region 1 DVD set. On the Blu-ray Disc set, each episode is encoded in 1080p, VC-1 compression with a 1.78:1 aspect ratio and is presented with a Dolby Digital 5.1 audio track.

The second season was released on September 22, 2009 in North America and on November 16, 2009 in the United Kingdom on DVD and Blu-ray.

In Ireland the second season was released along with a boxset containing the first and second seasons of the show on November 16, 2009.
The North American release date was originally planned to "coincide with the home video release of the summer blockbuster Terminator Salvation", but the release of Terminator Salvation was later postponed to December 1, 2009. In New Zealand the second season DVD set was released on November 11, 2009 as was a boxed set containing both seasons.

Response

Cancellation 
Following the announcement of the show's fate, fans have led numerous campaigns to revive the show ever since. Josh Friedman dismissed crowdfunding in March 2013 due to issues involving holder rights, according to IGN. A movie was also considered, as Thomas Dekker and producer James Middleton confirmed in interviews. Cinemablend chose Terminator: The Sarah Connor Chronicles as one of the "12 Shows Fox Should Be Embarrassed About Canceling" in October 2015.

Ratings 
Seasonal rankings (based on a weighted average total viewers per episode) for Terminator: The Sarah Connor Chronicles in the United States:

The show was officially canceled on May 18, 2009. A third season was not produced.

The series premiere in the United States was watched by 18.3 million viewers during its premiere timeslot on January 13, 2008.

Critical reception 
On review aggregator Rotten Tomatoes season 1 has a score of 76% based on reviews from 34 critics, and season 2 has rating of 94% based on 16 reviews. On Metacritic, the first season has an average score of 74 out of 100 based on 24 reviews. The second season has a score of 67, based on only 4 reviews.

Robert Bianco of USA Today gave the premiere episode four and a half stars out of five, calling the series, "smart, tough and entertaining." Gina Bellafante of The New York Times referred to it as "one of the more humanizing adventures in science fiction to arrive in quite a while". The Los Angeles Times declared the show "has heart and feeling" and "an almost Shakespearean exploration of fate vs. character" that features "plenty of really great fight scenes, and explosions, as well as neat devices developed in the future and jury-rigged in the present." Film industry journal Daily Variety declared the series pilot "a slick brand extension off this profitable assembly line" that showcases "impressive and abundant action with realistic visual effects and, frankly, plenty of eye candy between Glau and Headey." At the start of the second season, Variety praised "Headey's gritty performance as Sarah—managing to be smart, resourceful and tough, yet melancholy and vulnerable as well" and that the Chronicles "continue to deliver", getting "considerable mileage out of the constant peril" facing the characters. The Connecticut Post placed it on its list of the top 10 TV shows of 2008: "It's smart, with thought-provoking meditations on parenthood, destiny and human nature, and features good performances by Lena Headey, as Sarah, and Summer Glau."

Not all response was positive. One report from La Lámina Corredora reported "the pilot feels too much like a cheap remake of T2." Tim Goodman of the San Francisco Chronicle derided the entire conceptualization and production of the series. Though limited to his viewing of the first two episodes, Goodman leveled criticism against Fox for having "taken the wholly predictable course of putting a lot of money into explosions and regenerating cyborgs" but not having "paid much attention to plot, casting or writing."

In his review of the second season, Travis Fickett at IGN felt despite a few middling episodes and the restrictions of a TV budget, "[the series] turned out to be intelligent, complex and consistently operated on a deeper emotional level than anyone could have expected." Looking back on the series, Alan Sepinwall of The Star-Ledger was disappointed by Sarah and John as well as the sluggish pace of the show; however, he felt these weaknesses were outweighed by the strength of the performances of Summer Glau, Brian Austin Green and Garret Dillahunt as well as the writers' commitment to showing the emotional toll on the characters. Commenting on the final episode of season two, he called it a "terrific" finale which took the show in a new potential-filled direction. In May 2009 the show won the E!Online "Save One Show" poll, and has received positive coverage from places such as Wired and CNN. In an effort to keep the series on the air, fans created support communities on Facebook and MySpace and uploaded videos to YouTube. Creator Josh Friedman confirmed to CliqueClack that he has vowed to never reveal how the series would have progressed or ended.

Awards 
Terminator: The Sarah Connor Chronicles won the following awards:
 Saturn Award: Best Supporting Actress on Television, 2007 (Summer Glau) – Tied with Elizabeth Mitchell for Lost

The series was also nominated for the following awards:
 Saturn Award: Best Actress on Television, 2007 (Lena Headey)
 Saturn Award: Best Network Television Series, 2007
 Teen Choice Awards: Choice TV Actress: Action, 2008 (Summer Glau)
 Teen Choice Awards: Choice TV: Breakout Show, 2008
 Teen Choice Awards: Choice TV: Female Breakout Star, 2008 (Summer Glau)
 Teen Choice Awards: Choice TV: Male Breakout Star, 2008 (Thomas Dekker)
 Teen Choice Awards: Choice TV Show: Action, 2008
 Primetime Emmy Award: Outstanding Single-Camera Picture Editing for a Drama Series, 2008 (Paul Karasick for "Pilot")
 Primetime Emmy Award: Outstanding Special Visual Effects, 2008 (James Lima, Chris Zapara, Lane Jolly, Steve Graves, Rick Schick, Jeff West and Bradley Mullennix for "Pilot")
 Primetime Emmy Award: Outstanding Stunt Coordination, 2008 (Joel Kramer for "Gnothi Seauton")
 Visual Effects Society Award: Outstanding Visual Effects in a Broadcast Series, 2008 (James Lima, Raoul Bolognini, Andrew Orloff, Steve Meyer for Episode 108)

References

External links

 Terminator: The Sarah Connor Chronicles on TheWB.com
 

 
2000s American science fiction television series
2000s American time travel television series
2008 American television series debuts
2009 American television series endings
American action adventure television series
American time travel television series
American sequel television series
Androids in television
Alternative sequel television series
Apocalyptic television series
English-language television shows
Fox Broadcasting Company original programming
Live action television shows based on films
Saturn Award-winning television series
Television series about artificial intelligence
Television series about multiple time paths
Television series set in the 1990s
Television series set in the 2000s
Television series by Warner Bros. Television Studios
Television shows filmed in New Mexico
Television shows set in New Mexico
Television shows set in Los Angeles
Works by Ashley Miller and Zack Stentz